= Orde Boerevolk =

Boer Liberation Political Movement

Orde Boerevolk is a far-right, white nationalist political party in South Africa. The party was founded in 1989 by former security policeman Piet Rudolph, a white supremacist group that was active in South Africa during the apartheid era.

Orde Boerevolk advocated for the creation of an independent Afrikaner state, which would be established through the forced removal of non-Afrikaners from the territory. The party has been accused of promoting hate speech and promoting violence against non-whites, and has been criticized by human rights groups and other political parties in South Africa.

Orde Boerevolk has a small but dedicated following, and has participated in several high-profile events, including a rally in Pretoria in 2019 in which party members marched with firearms. The party has also been involved in violent clashes with anti-fascist activists and has been banned from participating in certain events due to concerns about public safety.
